Douglas Center (at one time spelled Douglass Center) is an unincorporated community in Marquette County, Wisconsin, United States, between Briggsville and Oxford, in the town of Douglas, on County Road P between County Roads A and O. It was formerly the site of a post office, and the home of State Representative Robert Mitchell.

Notes

Unincorporated communities in Marquette County, Wisconsin
Unincorporated communities in Wisconsin